The Chiredzi River is a river in southeastern Zimbabwe. It is a tributary of the Runde River, and is dammed at Manjirenji Dam, which is recognised as an important wetland.

See also
 Chiredzi
 Chiredzi District

References

Rivers of Zimbabwe
Save River (Africa)